Places in the ancient Godalming hundred of Surrey (with their probable meanings) include:

Alfold ("old enclosure")
Amberley (Imberlēah meaning "riverside clearing")
Artington (from heorotingdon meaning "hill of the people of the sacred hart"
Bagmoor (possibly from the personal name Bacca + Moor, or perhaps meaning "badger's moor")
Binscombe (from possible Brythonic personal name Buden + Combe, meaning "Buden's Valley")
Brook (Brōc meaning "fast flowing stream" in Old English; cognate with Dutch broek, German bruch)
Busbridge (Bus + bridge, perhaps referring to the old bridge over the lake)
Catteshall (Gattes Hill meaning "gate or route to hill")
Chiddingfold (Chadingesfold meaning "enclosure of the people of the hollow")
Chinthurst (Chint + hurst, the second word means "wooded hill")
Compton (Probably a corruption of comb + tun meaning "valley estate")
Cosford (probably from "Cusa's Ford" but possibly from Welsh cors meaning bog, fen; hence "bog by the ford")
Culmer (Col mere meaning "cool or deep lake")
Cut Mill ("mill in the valley")
Dunsfold ("hilltop enclosure")
Eashing ("people of Essa")
Elstead (Ellested meaning "Place where the Elder trees grow")
Emley or Bowlhead Green (Eme lēah meaning "Ema's Clearing")
Enton (unknown, derived from En + tun, possibly "estate end")
Farncombe (Fernecome meaning "marshy valley")
Feathercombe (possibly meaning "wooded valley")
Frillinghurst ("the wooded hill of the people of the forest edge")
Godalming (Godhelm Ingas meaning "the people of Godhelm")
Grafham (Grafhæm meaning "farm by the grove")
Hambledon (Hameledūn probably meaning "flat-topped hill")
Hankley (Hank + lēah, meaning either "Hank's clearing" or possibly "dry clearing")
Hascombe (Hægtessecombe, meaning "valley of the witch")
Hurling (Hurlingas, meanin "Hurl's people"
Hurtmore (heorotmera, the second part means "hart (deer) lake")
Hurthill ("deer hill")
Hydestyle (unknown)
Hydon ("high hill")
Lascombe (the second part means "valley")
Littleton ("small estate")
Losley (Loselēah, the second part means "clearing")
Loxhill 
Lydling ("little people")
Milford ("the ford by the mill")
Mousehill, Surrey (possibly literal, probably Middle English)
Munstead (possibly "Mun's place")
Northbourne ("north stream")
Nurscombe (Notescombe meaning "Note's valley"
Ockford (Hocford, "ford of the River Ock")
Ockley (Occalēah, "Occa's clearing")
Peper Harrow (Pīpereheōrge, "heathen temple of the Pipers")
Polsted (the second part means "place")
Prior's Field ("pasture of the Prior"
Puttenham (originally Reddesolhæm, the second part means "farm", the first part may be a given name.)
Rodborough, see also Rodborough School (unknown, but the second part refers to a burh which is a "fortified camp")
Rodsall (derived from the same name as Puttanham, above, Reddesolhæm)
Sandhills (possibly literal, probably Middle English)
Shackleford (Sakelesford, possibly derived from scacol meaning "tongue of land crossing")
Shackstead (Scuccastead, "evil spirit place")
Tadmoor  (unknown, but some high ground)
Tilford "fertile river crossing"
Tiltham "fertile farm"
Thursley (Þunreslēah, "sacred clearing of Thunor"
Thorncombe Street "wild valley"
Truxford (unknown but a river crossing)
Tuesley (Tīweslēah, "sacred clearing of Tyr"
Unsted (see Munstead)
Winkford (unknown but a river crossing, perhaps with a given name)
Winkworth (the first part means "corner" or "nook", the second part means a "walled enclosure")
Witley (Witlēah, "white clearing" perhaps due to Silver Birch trees)
Wormley (Wormlēah, "clearing of snakes", perhaps due to many adders in the vicinity)
Yagden Hill (unknown, but the second part "den" is derived from dun meaning "hill")

 Mills, Anthony David, A Dictionary of British Place-Names'' (2003), Oxford University Press

https://www.scribd.com/doc/49653561/3/Surrey
http://www.localhistories.org/names.html

History of Surrey